PSE Archery, Inc. is a privately owned American archery supply company which has developed, designed, and manufactured bows, arrows, and other equipment since 1971. The company was founded by Pete Shepley in Mahomet, Illinois, and has its corporate headquarters in Tucson, Arizona.  PSE Archery is one of the leading bow, crossbow and flowbow manufacturers in the world, its products are widely used in many fields including hunting and sports.

History
PSE, short for Precision Shooting Equipment, was founded by Pete Shepley, a product engineer of Magnavox, as a part-time pursuit. Shepley was a specialist in creating archery equipment and created the company in 1971 to help this interest. PSE was one of five companies to have produced the first compound bows and is reputed for a number of patented innovations in this industry.

Products

PSE is known for producing high performance bows, in 2014 the Full Throttle was introduced and is the current fastest bow on the market, IBO speeds of 370 fps.

References

External links
Official website

Archery
Sporting goods manufacturers of the United States
Manufacturing companies based in Arizona
Companies based in Tucson, Arizona
Manufacturing companies established in 1971